Flurina Kobler is a Swiss curler.

At the national level, she is a 2016 Swiss mixed doubles champion curler.

At the international level, she is a participant of 2016 World Mixed Doubles Curling Championship together with Yves Hess, they finished twenty eight.

Teams

Women's

Mixed

Mixed doubles

References

External links

Video: 

Living people
Swiss female curlers
Swiss curling champions
Year of birth missing (living people)
Place of birth missing (living people)